This is a list of schools in the Indian state of West Bengal.

Asansol 

 Asansol Arunoday High School
 Domohani Kelejora High School
 Loreto Convent, Asansol
 St. Patrick's Higher Secondary School
 St. Vincent's High and Technical School
 DAV Public School
 Delhi Public School

 Kendriya Vidyalaya

Cooch Behar

 Munshirhat Sadekia High Madrasah
 Kendriya vidyalaya Coochbehar Behar

 Jawahar Navodaya Vidyalaya, Coochbehar

Darjeeling 

Victoria Boys School

Howrah

Kolkata

Durgapur 

 St. Xavier's School, Durgapur

Kharagpur

 Kharagpur Atulmoni Polytechnic High School
 Kharagpur Silver Jubilee High School

Other locations 

West Bengal
 List